Maytown is an unincorporated community in Thurston County, in the U.S. state of Washington. The community is situated off I-5 and is east of Littlerock.

Etymology
Folklore about the naming of the community mentions that a first settler named the town when he said, "It may become a town, and it may not, so I'll call it Maytown".

History
Maytown was founded as a lumber town in 1911, and named after Maytown, Kentucky, the native home of the proprietor of a local sawmill.  A post office was in operation at Maytown from 1922 until 1928.

Parks and recreation
The community is close to Millersylvania State Park. Other nearby recreational spots include Offutt Lake and the Scatter Creek Unit and Scatter Creek Wildlife Recreation Area.

References

Unincorporated communities in Thurston County, Washington